Duncan Douglas (born 22 November 1965) is an American biathlete. He competed at the 1992 Winter Olympics and the 1994 Winter Olympics.

References

External links
 

1965 births
Living people
American male biathletes
Olympic biathletes of the United States
Biathletes at the 1992 Winter Olympics
Biathletes at the 1994 Winter Olympics
Sportspeople from New York City